Tich may refer to:

English cricketers 
 Tich Cornford (1900–1964), Sussex cricketer
 Tich Freeman (1888–1965), Kent cricketer
 Tom Richmond (cricketer) (1890–1957), Nottinghamshire cricketer

Entertainers 
 Ian "Tich" Amey of Dave Dee, Dozy, Beaky, Mick & Tich, British 1960s pop group
 Michael "Tich" Anderson, drummer of the early 1980s Scottish band Altered Images
 Anthony "Tich" Critchlow, drummer of the late 1980s band Living in a Box
 Tich Gwilym (1951–2005), Welsh rock guitarist
 Little Tich (1867–1928), English music hall comedian
 Tich (singer) (born 1994), English singer

TICH 
 Tropical Institute of Community Health and Development - see Great Lakes University of Kisumu, Kenya
 Tayside Institute of Child Health, associated with Ninewells Hospital in Dundee, Scotland

Other 
 Tich McFarlane (1916–2001), Australian air force officer and public servant
 George Palliser (1919–2011), Second World War Royal Air Force flying ace
 George Shorten (born 1901), Australian rules footballer
 Walter Cowan (1871–1956), British admiral in both world wars
 Tich (dog), awarded the Dickin Medal for bravery in World War II
 Tich, a ventriloquist's dummy presented by Ray Alan in Tich and Quackers

See also 
 Titch (disambiguation)

Lists of people by nickname